Jory Nash is a folk music-oriented Canadian singer-songwriter and musician based in Cobourg, Ontario, Canada.

Nash blends elements of folk, jazz, blues, soul and pop into an original stew of sound. He plays primarily acoustic guitar and piano, and occasionally plays the 5 string banjo.

In late 2022, Nash stepped away from writing, performing and producing music.

Albums
 One Way Down (1998)
 Tangle With the Ghost (2000)
 Lo-Fi Northern Blues (2002)
 Spaz Loves Weezie (2004)
 Folk, Jazz, Blues & Soul (2007)
 New Blue Day (2009)
 Little Pilgrim (2012)
 The Many Hats of Jory Nash (2015)
 Wilderness Years (2018)

Awards

2001 Ontario Council of Folk Festivals "Songs From The Heart" Award for the song "When I Walk Out"

2010 Penguin Eggs Magazine's Critic's Poll Album of the Year for "New Blue Day"

2010 Canadian Folk Music Awards Nominee for Best Producer for "New Blue Day"

2013 Canadian Folk Music Awards Nominee for Best Producer for "Little Pilgrim"

2015 Canadian Folk Music Awards Nominee for Best Contemporary Singer & Best Producer for "The Many Hats of Jory Nash"

2018 Canadian Folk Music Award Nominee for Best Producer for "Wilderness Years"

Career Outside of Music
Nash is a past director at the Canadian company "ALIVE Outdoors" an experiential and outdoor education company specializing in the creation and delivery of customized, meaningful programs for schools and organizations. He works with many students in the Canadian Wilderness to provide an outdoor education and camp experience.

In late October 2022 Nash stepped away from music. He now trades stocks for a living.

References

External links
 Official site

Canadian folk singer-songwriters
Canadian male singer-songwriters
Living people
Year of birth missing (living people)